Wuhan University School of Chinese Classics  is a school in Wuhan University that teaches Chinese classics, a joint collaboration between Wuhan's Schools of Chinese, History, and Philosophy. The school awards undergraduate, master, and doctoral degrees, one of the few in China to offer a comprehensive education in Chinese classics. Japanese is a mandatory second language in the school.

References

External links
School website

Wuhan University Faculty of Humanities